Segenet Kelemu is an Ethiopian scientist, noted for her research as a molecular plant pathologist, and outstanding scientific leadership. For close to three decades, Kelemu and her team's research has contributed to addressing agricultural constraints in Africa, Asia, Latin America and North America.

Since 2013, Kelemu has been the Director General of the International Centre of Insect Physiology and Ecology, Africa's only institute dedicated to research on insects and other arthropods. Previously, she was the Director of Biosciences eastern and central Africa (BecA); Vice President of Programs at the Alliance for a Green Revolution in Africa (AGRA), and Leader of Crop and Agroecosystem Health Management at the International Center for Tropical Agriculture (CIAT).

Kelemu has received many international accolades including: the L'Oréal-UNESCO Awards for Women in Science in 2014; Fellow, TWAS − The World Academy of Sciences; honorary doctorate by Tel Aviv University, in May 2016; recognition as one of Forbes Africa top 100 most influential African women, in May 2014; mentioned as one of 10 most influential African women in agriculture by the Journal of Gender, Agriculture and Food Security (AgriGender Journal) and election as a Fellow of the African Academy of Sciences. Her other honours include: CIAT's Outstanding Senior Scientist Award; Friendship Award granted by the People's Republic of China and the TWAS Prize for Agricultural Sciences, by TWAS, The World Academy of Sciences.

Early life

Segenet Kelemu was born in the Ethiopian town of Finote Selam.  In school, Kelemu, though prone to challenging and contradicting teachers, demonstrated self-determination and, above all, academic prowess. She was fortunate to have teachers who recognized and nurtured her potential.

Like many other children in her village, Kelemu was expected to help out with farming chores. Moreover, from an early age, she displayed a strong sense of responsibility, and as a result, her mother assigned her the task of selling farm produce in the market; certain that she would negotiate the best prices and keep the money safe. Thus, Kelemu learnt the hard truths about agriculture: its back breaking labour—especially for women, as well challenges to productivity, which placed people in her community in a constant struggle to meet minimum households food needs; but amidst all, the sector's potential. As a result, she felt a calling to seek solutions for agricultural constraints. Therefore, though an all-round top grade student, Kelemu decided to dedicate herself to science and agriculture.

Education

In 1974, Kelemu became the first woman from her region to join Addis Ababa University—where she was one of a handful girls in a class of 200—graduating, on top of her class, with a Bachelor's degree in 1979. She then relocated  to the US. At Montana State University, she earned a master's degree in plant pathology and genetics in 1985. She subsequently attended Kansas State University, earning a PhD in molecular biology and plant pathology in 1989. Her PhD thesis was "Molecular cloning and characterization of an avirulence gene from Xanthomonas campestris pv. oryzae". Kelemu undertook postdoctoral research on the molecular determinants of pathogenesis at Cornell University from 1989 to 1992.

Career
Between 1992 and 2007, Kelemu worked at the International Center for Tropical Agriculture (CIAT), Colombia, first as a Senior Scientist, and later Leader of Crop and Agroecosystem Health Management. Her research focused on elucidation of molecular determinants of host-pathogen interactions, development of novel plant disease control strategies including genetic engineering, biopesticides, pathogen population genetics and dynamics, endophytic microbes and their role in plant development. In August 2007, Kelemu decided to return to Africa, determined to contribute her experience in applying cutting-edge science to developmental issues, towards resolving the continent's problem. She accepted a position as the Director of the Biosciences eastern and central Africa (BecA) Hub. Under her leadership, the BecA initiative was transformed from a contentious idea into a driving force that is changing the face of African biosciences. BecA's research capacity, staff, facilities, funding, partners and training programs have expanded at an ever accelerating pace. She has assembled and inspired a scientific and technical team bound by a common passion for using science to enhance Africa's biosciences development. In 2013, Kelemu joined the Alliance for a Green Revolution in Africa (AGRA) as Vice President for Programs for about a year. In November 2013, Kelemu became the Director General of the International Centre of Insect Physiology and Ecology (ICIPE), Africa's only institution dedicated to research on insects and other arthropods, which is headquartered in Nairobi, Kenya. She is the fourth chief executive and the first woman to head the institution.

In January 2018, Kelemu was singled out by philanthropist Bill Gates as one of five "heroes [whose] lives inspire me".

Awards and recognitions

Advisory boards

Personal life
Kelemu is married to Arjan Gijsman and has a daughter named Finote Gijsman. They reside in Nairobi. She enjoys reading biographies.

References

Living people
Addis Ababa University alumni
Ethiopian women scientists
Kansas State University alumni
Montana State University alumni
Women phytopathologists
Fellows of the African Academy of Sciences
L'Oréal-UNESCO Awards for Women in Science laureates
20th-century women scientists
21st-century women scientists
TWAS laureates
1956 births
People from Finote Selam